Radovanje is a village in the municipality of Velika Plana, Serbia. According to the 2002 census, the village has a population of 689 people. Radovanjski Lug was the site of the assassination of Karađorđe Petrović, leader of the First Serbian Uprising, in 1817.

References

Populated places in Podunavlje District